Shoe Show, Inc. is an American footwear retailer based in Concord, North Carolina. It operates shoe stores throughout the United States under the brands Shoe Show, Shoe Dept., Shoe Dept. Encore, Shoebilee!, Burlington Shoes, and Shoe Show Mega.

The company was founded in 1960 by Robert B. Tucker and has more than 1150 locations. It acquired Burlington Shoes in 1986, Altier Shoes in 1993 and Shoebilee! in 2002. In the early 2000s, the company began opening Shoe Dept. Encore stores, which are larger than regular Shoe Dept. stores.

References

External links
Shoe Show website

Shoe companies of the United States
Companies based in North Carolina
American companies established in 1960
Retail companies established in 1960
Footwear retailers of the United States